Mangelia terpnisma is a species of sea snail, a marine gastropod mollusk in the family Mangeliidae.

Description
The length of the shell attains 9 mm, its diameter 3 mm.

(Original description) The fusiform shell is characterized by its stout build. The 8 whorls are once-angled. They are longitudinally crassicostate with straight ribs and spirally lirate with irregular lirae. Its color is whitish, banded and filleted with chestnut. The incrassate outer lip is much thickened, taeniate, within blood-red or, in one example, chestnut. The columella is stained at the base with the same colour. The aperture is narrow, cinereous or slate-coloured within. The very short siphonal canal is slightly curved.

Distribution
This marine species occurs in the Gulf of Oman.

References

External links
  Tucker, J.K. 2004 Catalog of recent and fossil turrids (Mollusca: Gastropoda). Zootaxa 682:1–1295.

terpnisma
Gastropods described in 1901